The Samsung Galaxy A8 and Samsung Galaxy A8+ (2018) are upper-midrange Android smartphones produced by Samsung Electronics. They were announced on 19 December 2017. The devices run Android 7.1.1 "Nougat" out-of-the-box with Samsung Experience 8.5.

Product positioning
As a less expensive alternative to the flagship Samsung Galaxy S8/S8+, the midrange A8/A8+ have a similar "Infinity Display" design aesthetic with an 18.5:9 panel and narrow bezels. However, the A8's display is a FHD+ resolution flat panel, compared to the S8's QHD+ curved panel.

Variants

References

Android (operating system) devices
Samsung Galaxy
Samsung smartphones
Mobile phones introduced in 2018
Discontinued smartphones